The Lee and Joe Jamail Texas Swimming Center is an aquatics facility at the University of Texas at Austin in the USA. It is home to the university's swimming and diving teams, a variety of university-offered swimming and scuba-diving classes, as well as Longhorn Aquatics, a youth program. The facility also hosts the annual State high school championships in swimming and diving, run by the University Interscholastic League.

The building is named after UT graduate and longtime benefactor Joe Jamail and his wife Lee. Before the Jamail's name was placed on the facility in the mid-1990s, the building was known simply as the "Texas Swimming Center". The view of the Texas State Capitol from the building's terrace became one of the Capitol View Corridors protected under state and local law from obstruction by tall buildings in 1983.

Amenities
The building houses two separate pools:
The main pool, used for competitive swimming, is 50 meters long by 25 yards wide and is 9 feet deep. Two retractable bulkheads, stored on cranes in recesses in the ceiling of the building, can be lowered and maneuvered, allowing the pool a variety of possible configurations. Some of these include: a long course practice setup, with ten 50m lanes; short course practice, with anywhere from 16 to 22 25-yard lanes; competition long course with eight 50m lanes; competition short course with eight 25 yard/meter competition lanes, and warm up/down lanes; competition short-course with sixteen 25-yard lanes (two courses of 8 lanes each); and competition center course with eight 25-yard lanes centered between several warm up/down lanes on either side.
The diving well is 25 yards long by 25 yards wide. The north end of the well houses 4 separate 1-meter springboards and two 3-meter springboards and is 15 feet deep. The south end of the well houses the platform tower with 1-, 3-, 5-, 7.5-, and 10-meter platforms, as well as four 3-meter springboards; this end is 18 feet deep. Both ends have a bubbler system, which creates bubbles in the water that can lessen the surface tension of the water. The diving well can also be arranged as a lap pool.

Pool Records

Men's Short Course Pool Records

Women's Short Course Pool Records

References

External links
Jamail Texas Swimming Center at UT Recreational Sports
Lee and Joe Jamail Texas Swimming Center

College swimming venues in the United States
Sports venues in Austin, Texas
Swimming venues in Austin, Texas
Texas Longhorns sports venues
University of Texas at Austin campus